Fernande Bochatay (born 23 January 1946) is a former Swiss alpine skier. At the 1968 Winter Olympics, she won the bronze medal in Giant Slalom.

Bochatay was the aunt of Swiss speed skier Nicolas Bochatay, who was killed on a training run at the 1992 Winter Olympics. She married in 1968 and next year retired from competitions. The year after she gave birth to her first child, and two more followed later. She was still skiing in her late sixties with her grandchildren.

References

1946 births
Living people
Swiss female alpine skiers
Olympic bronze medalists for Switzerland
Alpine skiers at the 1964 Winter Olympics
Alpine skiers at the 1968 Winter Olympics
Olympic medalists in alpine skiing
Medalists at the 1968 Winter Olympics
Sportspeople from Valais
20th-century Swiss women